Tomasz Strząbała (born 19 January 1966) is a Polish handball coach.

References

1966 births
Living people
Sportspeople from Kielce
Polish handball coaches